The Academic Bill of Rights (ABOR) is a document created and distributed by a branch of the David Horowitz Freedom Center, a think tank founded by the conservative writer David Horowitz.  It has been criticized for using broad-based egalitarian principles and a self-identified "bipartisan" framework to promote what critics describe as an ideological agenda.

Criticism
A number of organizations representing a variety of political viewpoints have expressed pointed critique of both the ABOR's aims and its content.

One of the first organizations to come out in opposition to the bill was the American Association of University Professors (AAUP). While agreeing with the underlying principles of freedom, equality, and pluralism in the university community, the association said that the bill "infringes academic freedom in the very act of purporting to protect it."

Some individual academics regard the ABOR, along with the Santorum Amendment, as a threat to academic freedom. Others have suggested that the ABOR may allow students to claim discrimination when tested on evolution.

Moderate, libertarian, and conservative critics of the ABOR have asserted that it would open the door to a right wing version of the campus speech code.  An article by David T. Beito, Ralph E. Luker and KC Johnson in the Perspectives magazine of the American Historical Association warned that the ABOR "could snuff out all controversial discussion in the classroom. A campus governed by the ABOR would present professors with an impossible dilemma: either play it safe or risk administrative censure by saying something that might offend an overly sensitive student."

The American Library Association also opposed the ABOR, with members approving a resolution stating that the Bill "would impose extra-academic standards on academic institutions, directly interfering in course content, the classroom, the research process, and hiring and tenure decisions."

A number of other groups have also opposed the ABOR, including the American Federation of Teachers, the National Coalition Against Censorship (NCAC), and others. Some left-leaning groups, including Refuse and Resist, and the AFL–CIO, expressed concern and criticism of the Bill, particularly warning against the regulatory oversight that the bill would place upon academic institutions, if passed.

See also 
 Academic freedom
 Academic Freedom bills
 Academic administration
 Bill of rights
 Florida House Bill H-837

References

Bill of Rights
David Horowitz
Criticism of academia